The Tournament for the Iraqi Armed Forces was a friendly football competition in Iraq hosted by Al-Shaab Stadium on 21 March 2015 and contested between the four biggest clubs in Baghdad: Al-Quwa Al-Jawiya, Al-Shorta, Al-Talaba and Al-Zawraa. The event was held in support of the Iraqi Armed Forces and the Popular Mobilization Forces and their fight against terrorism.

Entry was free for spectators and the tournament consisted of three 30-minute matches, culminating in Al-Zawraa winning the cup by beating Al-Quwa Al-Jawiya 5–4 in a penalty shootout.

Semi-finals

Final

References

External links
 Iraqi Football Website

Bagh
Football in Baghdad